Enesay is a beverage company in Kyrgyzstan.  Its primary products are Tan, Arshan, and Tamshan.  These beverages are based on the traditional Kyrgyz drinks chalap, maksym, and a mix of them, respectively.  They also sell bottled water under the name "Artezian."  Their products can be bought in bottles in a majority of stores, or "on tap" on street corners (see picture) and at bazaars in most cities in the country.

Their primary competitor is Shoro, which produces similar beverages and distributes them in similar ways.

Food and drink companies of Kyrgyzstan